During the 2009–10 German football season, VfB Stuttgart competed in the Bundesliga.

Season summary
Manager Markus Babbel was sacked in early December with Stuttgart in 16th place. Christian Gross, his successor, revitalised Stuttgart and they finished in 6th, qualifying for the Europa League.

Players

First-team squad
Squad at end of season

Left club during season

VfB Stuttgart II
The following players played for VfB Stuttgart II, and did not play for the first team this season.

Results

DFB-Pokal

First round

Second round

Third round

Champions League

Play-off round

Stuttgart won 2–0 on aggregate.

Group stage

Notes
 Note 4: Unirea Urziceni played their home group matches at Stadionul Steaua in Bucharest as their Stadionul Tineretului did not meet UEFA criteria.

Round of 16

Barcelona won 5–1 on aggregate.

References

Notes

VfB Stuttgart seasons
Stuttgart